Hum Tum Aur Woh is a 1971 Bollywood drama film directed by Shiv Kumar. The film stars Vinod Khanna, Bharathi and Aruna Irani.

Plot
Vijay is in love with Aarti and tries to woo her by disguising himself as a Sanskrit teacher. She learns about him and eventually also falls in love with him. However, Vijay and Lalita are engaged, which Aarti later discovers.

Aarti's dad Shaymlal is under threat of being killed and also businessman Mahendranath. A murder attempt on Mahendranath fails and the culprit is killed in a nightclub. There are several suspects of Mahendranath's attempted murder, including Lalita, Jagat Murari and Shyamlal.

Vijay tries to warn Shyamlal that his life is in danger, but Shyamlal does not believe him.

One day Shyamlal is killed and Aarti thinks that Vijay is the murderer, as only he is present at the site.

Will Vijay be able to prove his innocence to Aarti and the real culprit be caught?

Cast
Ashok Kumar as Mahendranath
Vinod Khanna as Vijay
Bharathi as Aarti
Aruna Irani as Lalita
Helen as Anita / Lily
K. N. Singh as Advocate  
Jalal Agha as Charandas
Sunder as Dayaram
Chandrashekhar as Vikram    
Tarun Bose as Shyamal
Sulochana Chatterjee as Mrs. Shyamlal 
Jagdish Raj as Inspector Khurana
Mohan Sherry as Ravi
Chaman Puri as Banwarilal
Nisar Ahmad Ansari as Jagat Murari
Dilip Dutt as Inspector Verma
Tun Tun as Rosie
Johnny Whiskey as Doctor
Keshav Rana as Stage producer
Jagdish Sethi as Board member
Bhagwan Sinha as Board member
Uma Dutt as Board member
Kamaldeep as Board member
Khurshid Khan as Board member
Shantilal J Sopariwala as Board member
Harbans Darshan M. Arora as shooter in the club

Soundtrack
The songs in the film were composed by the duo Kalyanji Anandji while all the lyrics were penned by Verma Malik. The song "Priya Praneshwari" is notable as it has been written in Sanskrit, a rarity in Hindi films.

External links
 

1971 films
1970s Hindi-language films
1971 drama films
Films scored by Kalyanji Anandji